Martin Stovold (28 December 1955 – 11 May 2012) was an English cricketer. He played for Gloucestershire between 1978 and 1982.

References

External links

1955 births
2012 deaths
English cricketers
Gloucestershire cricketers
People from Almondsbury
Sportspeople from Gloucestershire